An alloy is a material composed of two or more metals or a metal and a nonmetal.

Alloy may also refer to:

Entertainment
 Alloy (Skepticism album), 2008
 Alloy (Trillium album), 2011
 Alloy (comics), a combined form of the fictional characters Metal Men
Alloy Digital, a digital media company folded into Defy Media
Alloy Entertainment, a print and television unit sold to Warner Bros. Television

Other uses
 Alloy (specification language), a declarative specification language
 Alloy wheel, wheels made from an alloy of aluminum or magnesium
 Alloy, West Virginia, an unincorporated community in the US
 Aloy (Horizon Zero Dawn), the main playable character of the RPG game, Horizon Zero Dawn

See also
 Aloy